Forever (New Song + Collection) is Taiwanese Mandopop girl group S.H.E's second compilation album and 9th album overall. It was released on 21 July 2006 by HIM International Music.

It features songs from their fourth album Super Star in 2003 to seventh album Once Upon a Time in 2005. The previous compilation album, Together, included songs from 2001 to 2003. This album features five new songs, 13 previously released tracks, and a DVD featuring seven music videos. The music video for "觸電" (Electric Shock) features Taiwanese actor Joseph Chang.

Reception
The tracks "Ring Ring Ring" and "我們怎麼了" (What Happened to Us) were nominated for Top 10 Gold Songs at the Hong Kong TVB8 Awards, presented by television station TVB8, in 2006.

The track, "觸電" (Electric Shock), composed by Jay Chou, won one of the Top 10 Songs of the Year at the 2007 HITO Radio Music Awards presented by Taiwanese radio station Hit FM.

The album is the ninth best selling album in Taiwan with 69,000 copies sold in 2006.

Track listing
New tracks are in bold
 "觸電" Chu Dian (Electric Shock) - composed by Jay Chou
 "Ring Ring Ring"
 "我們怎麼了" Wo Men Zen Me Le (What Happened to Us)
 "紫藤花" Zi Teng Hua (Wisteria)
 "Goodbye My Love"
 "Super Star"
 "天灰" Tian Hui (Gray Sky)
 "獨唱情歌" Du Chang Qing Ge (Solo Madrigal) - Selina and Tank duet
 "花都開好了" Hua Dou Kai Hao Le (Flowers Have Blossomed) 
 "I.O.I.O"
 "候鳥" Hou Niao (Migratory Bird)
 "不想長大" Bu Xiang Zhang Da (Don't Wanna Grow Up)
 "波斯貓" Bo Si Mao (Persian Cat)
 "他還是不懂" Ta Hai Shi Bu Dong (He Still Doesn't Understand)
 "星光" Xing Guang (Starlight)
 "一眼萬年" Yi Yan Wan Nian (A Vision Of Eternity)
 "月桂女神" Yue Gui Nu Shen (Laurel Tree Goddess Daphne) 
 "痛快" Tong Kuai (Piquancy)

Bonus DVD
 "觸電" (Electric Shock) MV - composed by Jay Chou - feat Joseph Chang with Selina as lead
 "Ring Ring Ring" MV
 "Super Star" MV
 "波斯貓" (Persian Cat) MV
 "我愛你" (I Love You) MV
 "星光" (Starlight) MV
 "不想長大" (Don't Wanna Grow Up) MV
 Super Model Dancing Steps (Super Model 舞蹈教學)

References

External links
  S.H.E discography@HIM International Music

2006 compilation albums
2006 video albums
S.H.E albums
Music video compilation albums
HIM International Music albums